Arcavacata is an Italian hamlet (frazione) of the municipality of Rende in the province of Cosenza, Calabria. Its population is of 1,831.

History
The name Arcavacata comes from an ancient fortress-lookout Arce-vocata ("arx suited"), which is found in some papal documents of the Middle Ages. There's also legendary event located a few centuries after today.

On a rainy, windy winter night, a blind man and a lame man walked down the street in search of shelter. Suddenly a light illuminated the two patients and a voice ordered them to dig. Listened to the voice, the light led their way. While digging, they realized they were touching an arch and under the arch something particular stopped them. The light became more intense, it illuminated everything and so the blind man saw and the lame began to walk. The voice told them that they were healed and that a church should be built in that place. What they had found was a painting depicting the Holy Mother with baby Jesus. The church was erected and the picture was placed above the altar (it is still there today). Dug out of an arch, the picture gave its name to the place where it was found: Arcavacata. The painting is from the 14th century and is of perennial devotion to the Mother of Consolation by the inhabitants of Arcavacata.

Geography 

Culture

The hamlet of Arcavacata is famous because in its territory there is the University of Calabria, the largest campus in Italy. In the hystorical centre there are a lot of ancient construction like houses and old palace: for example the important palace of the noble family Magdalone of Rende.

There are also some important religious structures like the Saint Mary of Consolation's Church, built in the historical centre of Arcavacata in the second middle of the 19th century.

Gallery

See also
Orto Botanico dell'Università della Calabria

References

External links

Frazioni of the Province of Cosenza